"Before I Forget" is a song by American heavy metal band Slipknot, released as the third single from the band's third studio album, Vol. 3: (The Subliminal Verses) (2004). It was cited by AOL as the top metal song of the decade. It also won a Grammy Award for Best Metal Performance in 2006.

"Before I Forget" borrows elements from a much older Slipknot song "Carve", recorded before their self-titled album. The earliest version was in 1996 with Anders Colsefni on vocals. "Carve" was for the SR Demo 1997, referred to by fans as Crowz.

"It's about standing your ground and deciding to be a good person, no matter what people say," recalled singer Corey Taylor. "[Producer] Rick Rubin was convinced the chorus wouldn't work. I told him he was crazy. Lo and behold, it's one of our biggest songs and we won a Grammy for it."

The last 18 seconds of the full-length song feature morse code in the left channel spelling "Slipknot", and Taylor muttering, "You're wasting it", reversed.

The song was featured in the video games MotorStorm, Rock Band 3, Guitar Hero III: Legends of Rock and Guitar Hero Live.

Reception and awards
"Before I Forget" is widely regarded as one of the band's best songs. In 2020, Kerrang and Louder Sound ranked the song number seven and number six, respectively, on their lists of the greatest Slipknot songs.

After being nominated six times, the band won the 2006 Grammy Award for Best Metal Performance. It was the second track from the album to be nominated: "Vermilion" was nominated in 2005 for the same award.

Music video
The video for "Before I Forget" shows Slipknot performing the song unmasked and in casual clothes (all with black shirts), as opposed to their usual coveralls. The video makes use of strategic camera techniques in which the members' faces are never totally shown (in some instances, however, some of the band members' eyes are shown up close), thus keeping with the band's running theme of anonymity at the time. Their masks are shown next to them as they perform. At the end of the music video, the band immediately stops playing the song as it ends and they all walk away.

As of March 2023, the music video for "Before I Forget" has over 250 million views on YouTube.

The music video for "Before I Forget" was directed by Tony Petrossian and was voted as the "Most Rocking Video" by the Scuzz audience in the Top 100 Most Rocking Videos 2007.

This music video also helped to garner the band its first and only Grammy Award win for "Best Metal Performance" in 2006.

Track listing
7" vinyl part one

7" vinyl part two

US promo CD

EU promo CD

Charts

Certifications

References

2004 songs
2005 singles
Slipknot (band) songs
Roadrunner Records singles
Grammy Award for Best Metal Performance
Music videos directed by Tony Petrossian
Song recordings produced by Rick Rubin
Songs written by Paul Gray (American musician)
Songs written by Corey Taylor
Songs written by Jim Root
Songs written by Joey Jordison